Radical 63 or radical door meaning "door" is one of the 34 Kangxi radicals (214 radicals in total) composed of 4 strokes.

In the Kangxi Dictionary, there are 44 characters (out of 49,030) to be found under this radical.

In Japanese jōyō kanji (commonly used kanji), the radical  is replaced with the shinjitai (new) form , while the kyujitai (old) form as a component is used in hyōgai kanji.

Evolution

Derived characters

Variant forms

This radical takes different forms in different languages or characters.

Traditionally, both 戶 and 戸 were widely used in printing, while 户 was used only as a writing form. In the Kangxi Dictionary,  was chosen as the standard form, which was then inherited by Taiwan Traditional Chinese and Korean hanja.

In mainland China, after the adoption of simplified Chinese characters and xin zixing (new character forms), which used to be a handwriting form, became the standard xin zixing printing form. This change also applies to China's Guo Biao (national standard) Traditional Chinese which is used chiefly in printing Chinese classics.  is also the standard form in Hong Kong's List of Graphemes of Commonly-Used Chinese Characters, a non-mandatory standard of Hong Kong Traditional Chinese, though  appears more frequently in daily use. Note that in both mainland China and Hong Kong, the left component of  remains to be .

In Japan, the radical  in jōyō kanji (commonly used kanji, including ) are replaced with its shinjitai form , while in hyōgai kanji (characters from outside the jōyō kanji table), the radical remains to be , causing an inconsistency. Both  and  could be used as the radical's names in Japanese dictionaries' indexes.

Literature

External links

Unihan Database - U+6236

063
097